"Even Though I'm Leaving" is a song recorded by American country music singer Luke Combs. It was released in September 2019 as the second single to his second studio album, What You See Is What You Get.

Content
"Even Though I'm Leaving" is described as a "soft, mandolin-infused country song" and "stone-cold tear-jerker" by the blog Taste of Country. Co-written by Combs along with Wyatt Durrette and Ray Fulcher, the song features a dramatic interaction between a father and son. In three different scenarios, the son, who is the narrator, pleads his father not to leave him. In the first verse, the narrator is a child who is afraid of monsters under his bed, while the second features the son as a young adult going off to serve in the military, and the final verse features the son becoming emotional over his father's death. The song previously appeared on Combs's 2019 EP The Prequel.

Commercial performance
"Even Though I'm Leaving" reached No. 1 on Billboards Country Airplay chart on November 23, 2019 and stayed on top of the chart for three weeks. It then fell to No. 2 for the chart dated December 14, while Old Dominion's "One Man Band" overtook it at the top. It remained at No. 2 the following week (with Thomas Rhett's "Remember You Young" claiming the top spot) before returning to No. 1 for two additional weeks starting with the chart dated December 28, making for a total of five non-consecutive weeks at No. 1.  With this song, Combs also extended his record of first singles being consecutive No. 1s to seven on the Country Airplay chart.  It also reached a peak of number 11 on the Billboard Hot 100, becoming Combs' first top 20 entry on the chart.

The song was certified Gold by the RIAA on October 24, 2019. It has sold 226,000 copies in the United States as of March 2020.

Charts

Weekly charts

Year-end charts

Certifications

References

2019 songs
2019 singles
Columbia Records singles
Luke Combs songs
Black-and-white music videos
Songs written by Luke Combs
Songs written by Wyatt Durrette (songwriter)
Country ballads